In Atlanta, Georgia, trolleybuses, generally called trackless trolleys there, were a major component of the public transportation system in the middle decades of the 20th century, carrying some 80 percent of all transit riders during the period when the system was at its maximum size. At the end of 1949 Atlanta had a fleet of 453 trolleybuses, the largest in the United States, and it retained this distinction until 1952, when it was surpassed by Chicago.

History

Origins
As in many other cities, trolleybuses mostly took over streetcar routes.  Some Atlanta streetcar lines were converted to buses starting in 1925. Those early conversions were to "motor buses" (gasoline-powered buses), but starting in 1937 some streetcar lines were converted instead to trolleybuses. The first trolleybus route opened on June 28, 1937, and was a suburban route to East Point and with branches beyond to College Park and Hapeville.  A second route opened in 1940. Conversions continued until closure of the last streetcar line, in 1949. 

In 1950, 453 trolleybuses served 31 routes. Trolleybuses made up 70% of the fleet, but carried 80% of the transit system's riders.

Operation, continued growth
The transit system was owned and operated by the Georgia Power Company until June 1950, at which point it was sold to a group of local businessmen, who formed the Atlanta Transit Company (ATC).  Trolleybus service continued, and the large network of electric routes remained largely intact for another decade.  One of the system's unusual features was express operation, uncommon on trolleybus systems. Express service ultimately was implemented on eight routes, and these were equipped with  "sidings" in the overhead trolley wires to enable vehicles on express trips to pass those on "local" trips.  Although the pace of expansion slowed after 1950, it did not cease.  Extensions continued to be built under ATC, including the conversion of bus line 26-Perry Homes to trolleybuses in November 1956, and extensions of that route in 1960 and 1962.  There were 39 trolleybus routes at the end of 1962.

Closure
In late 1962 Atlanta Transit decided to phase out all trolleybus service the next year, to avoid the expense of having to string new overhead wires when extending service to new areas.  Another reason cited was the anticipated high cost and difficulty of obtaining new trolleybuses to replace ATC's large fleet, which ranged in age from 14 to 17 years. Since 1959, when Marmon-Herrington ceased production of trolleybuses, no manufacturer in North America was still making the electric vehicles (a situation which lasted until the late 1960s).  At the beginning of 1963 the active fleet included 273 trolleybuses. The entire electric system was converted to diesel buses over a period of less than one month in September 1963.  Atlanta's last trolleybus service operated on the night of September 27, 1963.

Fleet 
Over the years, Georgia Power (GP) purchased its trolleybuses from four different manufacturers:  Twin Coach, the St. Louis Car Company, Pullman-Standard and Brill.  The first came in 1937, the last in 1949.  GP's successor, Atlanta Transit Company, never purchased a trolleybus.

Fleet list

Routes
An early 1950s map of the trolleybus system detailed the following routes:"Trackless Trolley Map and Bus Lines circa 1950", Emory University Library
 2 Lucile Ave.
 2PD Ponce de Leon Avenue, Clairmont Ave., Ponce to Decatur (Poplar)
 2G via Lucile to West End (Inman)
 2W "West View" via Lucile Ave. to West End, then via Gordon St. to Mozley Park
 3B, 3WH Hunter St.
3I Irwin St.
4C Edgewood Avenue, McLendon to Candler Park (Clifton)
4L Edgewood Avenue, McLendon to Lake Claire
4F Federal Prison
4NM North Moreland
6 Forrest Ave., Briarcliff Rd., Oxford Rd. to Emory, 6C continues to Decatur/Clairmont
6A (Atlanta Ave.)  via Capitol Ave. and Atlanta Ave./Ormond to Grant Park
6AM (Amsterdam) Boulevard, Boulevard (now Monroe) almost to Piedmont
6G (Georgia Ave.) via Capitol Ave. and Georgia Ave. to Grant Park
 10 Gordon St.
10C Cascade Heights
10G, 10S Stewart Ave., to Melrose & Sylvan
10PA Peachtree Street to Ansley Park
10PP to Piedmont Park
10R Richland
 11 via Marietta Street to Chestnut St.
11E Englislh Avenue
11L (Lakewood) via Washington Street, Milton and Lakewood to Stewart-Lakewood Center
 13W West Fair
 15 "Virginia-McLynn": Memorial Drive, Moreland Avenue to Confederate
 16L, 16N Forrest, Highland to Lanier Place (L) and Noble Park in Morningside (N)
16S Sylvan Hills
 17 Edgewood Avenue, DeKalb Avenue, West Howard to Decatur
18S Memorial Drive, Boulevard Drive, 3rd, Hill, McDonough to Decatur
18C Memorial Drive, Boulevard Drive to East Lake (Candler at Glenwood)
 19A Bankhead Ave. to Brook Ave.
 19 also marked as 19R ("River") Bankhead Ave., Hollywood Rd., and Bolton Rd. to Marietta Rd. and Chattahoochee River
 20 Lee St. to East Point and via Central to Hapeville
(20C to College Park, 20E to East Point only, 20H to Downtown Hapeville, 20F to Ford Plant)
23 West Peachtree Street to Beverly (Midtown), then via Peachtree Street to Brookhaven Country Club (23B Buckhead, 23O Oglethorpe, 23W West Peachtree)
 27 Stewart Ave. to Hapeville

See also
 List of trolleybus systems in the United States
 Streetcars in Atlanta

References

Bibliography
 The Trolley Titans: A Mobile History of Atlanta (Interurbans Special 76, 1981). O.E. Carson. Glendale CA: Interurban Press. .

External links
 "Trackless Trolley Map and Bus Lines circa 1950", Emory Libraries
 Atlanta trolleybuses at Trolleybuses.net – Pictures, advertisements, literature about the trolleybus system in Atlanta 

Transportation in Atlanta
Atlanta
Atlanta
History of Atlanta